Horace Albert Brightman (September 22, 1923 – June 10, 1992) was an American professional basketball player and coach. 

Brightman played for the Boston Celtics of the Basketball Association of America during the 1946–47 season. He served as a player-coach for the Seattle Athletics of the Pacific Coast Professional Basketball League during the 1947–48 season.

Brightman was the head coach of the Seattle Redhawks from 1948 to 1956. He took the team to national prominence and attained a 180–68 record. Brightman unexpectedly left his role following an altercation with UCLA Bruins coach John Wooden during a 1956 game and struggled to return to the collegiate ranks. He had brief stints as a head coach in the American Basketball League and the American Basketball Association during the 1960s before retiring permanently from coaching. Brightman spent the rest of his life as an apartment manager until his death in 1992.

Early life
Brightman was born in Eureka, California. He attended Woodrow Wilson Classical High School in Long Beach, California. Brightman averaged a city-record 22.7 points per game and was selected as the California Interscholastic Federation Player of the Year in 1941. He had a short stint playing baseball as a catcher with the Cleveland Indians organisation as a 17-year-old before his career was ended when he injured his shoulder.

Playing career
Brightman played college basketball for Morris Harvey College (now University of Charleston) during the 1945–46 season. He averaged 22 points per game.

Brightman played 58 games for the Boston Celtics of the Basketball Association of America (BAA) during the league's inaugural 1946–47 season. He averaged 9.8 points per game and was the first Celtics player to score 20 points in a regular season game.

Brightman relocated to Seattle with his wife after making a visit there to see his parents. He joined the Seattle Athletics of the Pacific Coast Professional Basketball League as a player-coach. Brightman was the team's leading scorer and only All-League selection; the league went defunct in 1948.

From 1950 to 1952, Brightman played for the Madigan Generals, an independent semiprofessional basketball team.

Coaching career

Seattle Chieftains
On August 21, 1948, Brightman was hired by Seattle University as head coach of the Chieftains basketball team. He recorded 12–14 and 12–17 records during his first two seasons. Brightman saw an improvement when he recruited the O'Brien twins, Johnny and Eddie, after playing them in a semiprofessional baseball game in Wichita, Kansas, in 1950. Brightman and the O'Briens led the Chieftains to a 90–17 record in three seasons and turned the team into a nationally recognised program. The Chieftains notably defeated the Harlem Globetrotters 84–81 in a 1952 game.

Brightman was ahead of his time by eschewing the methodical pace used by most collegiate teams and encouraging his players to perform at an ultra-fast tempo. He did not create scouting reports about his opponents. Brightman's teams made four appearances in the NCAA tournament and one in the National Invitation Tournament (NIT). At the age of 29, he became the youngest collegiate coach to achieve 100 wins.

On March 19, 1956, the Chieftains played the UCLA Bruins in the 1956 NCAA basketball tournament. The game was a physical affair that involved frequent fouling of Chieftains players by the Bruins. Brightman, upset over the Bruins' treatment of his players, confronted Bruins head coach, John Wooden, on the sidelines with a "wordy battle." The Chieftains lost 94–70; Brightman was reported as trying to start a fight with Wooden after the game. Three days later, Brightman abruptly resigned from his $8,000 per year role as Seattle's head basketball and baseball coach. He denied any link to his incident with Wooden but instead indicated that he had secured a deal to coach a semiprofessional baseball team in Canada. It was revealed years later that Brightman had not resigned but had been provided with "an opportunity to resign"; he never revealed the reason for his departure. Elgin Baylor, who was to join the Chieftains the following season, alleged that Brightman was drunk during the game and forced to resign. Brightman amassed a 180–68 record during his eight seasons with the Chieftains.

Coaching hiatus
Brightman applied for coaching positions at other colleges but was overlooked because he had failed to obtain a college degree. He was hired as a television host on Channel 13 in Seattle six weeks after leaving Seattle University and became a local television celebrity. Brightman started on weekday afternoon shows before being moved to early morning programming including hosting a pre-dawn cooking show titled Al's Cellar Café. Brightman left the job by late 1956 and moved to Long Beach, California, to run a restaurant and then worked at a Douglas Aircraft Company plant. He unsuccessfully applied for the head coaching position of the Washington State Cougars in 1958 but was beaten by his former Madigan Generals teammate, Marv Harshman. The loss motivated Brightman to attain a bachelor's degree in English from Long Beach State University.

Return to coaching
Brightman coached basketball at Garden Grove High School and sold automobiles to make an income while earning his degree. He was named head coach for the San Francisco Saints of the American Basketball League (ABL) for the 1961–62 season. Brightman returned to Long Beach the following season to coach the Long Beach Chiefs before the ABL folded at the end of 1962. He stated in an interview after losing his position: "I have died every year for six years since I left the Chieftains."

Brightman coached high school and Amateur Athletic Union (AAU) basketball until 1967. He was appointed head coach for the Anaheim Amigos of the American Basketball Association (ABA) for the 1967–68 season. He was fired after attaining a 12–24 record.

Later life
Brightman never coached basketball again. He was a longtime operator of a California resort owned by Chuck Connors who was his teammate on the Boston Celtics. Brightman relocated to Maitland, Florida, in 1971 and worked for a property management business for two years. He moved to Portland, Oregon, and spent the remainder of his working life managing apartment houses.

Brightman was diagnosed with pancreatic cancer in 1992. He died on June 10 of that year at the age of 68. Brightman was survived by his wife and seven children.

Legacy
Brightman was inducted into the Seattle University Athletics Hall of Fame in 2011.

BAA career statistics

Regular season

Head coaching record

College

ABA

|-
| style="text-align:left;"|ANA
| style="text-align:left;"|
|36||12||24||.333|| style="text-align:center;"|5th in Western||-||-||-||-
| style="text-align:center;"|Missed Playoffs
|- class="sortbottom"
| style="text-align:left;"|Career
| ||36||12||24||.333|| ||-||-||-||-

References

External links

1923 births
1992 deaths
American men's basketball players
Anaheim Amigos coaches
Basketball coaches from California
Basketball players from California
Boston Celtics players
Charleston Golden Eagles men's basketball players
Deaths from liver cancer
Forwards (basketball)
Long Beach State Beach men's basketball players
Seattle Redhawks men's basketball coaches
Sportspeople from Eureka, California
Wilson Classical High School alumni